NOW is the fourth studio album from the band Girugämesh, released on December 16, 2009 in Japan, January 4, 2010 in the United States and on February 12 in Europe. Three editions of the album were released: a Regular Version CD, a Limited Version CD+DVD, and a Super Limited Version CD+DVD which includes the music videos for "Alive [PV]" and "Border [PV]", G-TRAVEL Footage, a documentary, and an interview about the album.

Track listing

Regular Edition

 "NOW [Intro]"                                                                1:40
 "bit crash"                                                                  2:22
 "NO MUSIC, NO REASON"                                                        3:41
 "ALIVE"                                                                      4:46
 "I think I can fly"                                                          3:39
 "BEAST"                                                                      3:14
 "nobody"                                                                     3:44
 "Suiren" (睡蓮)                                                3:52
 "DIRTY STORY"                                                                3:30
 "GAME"                                                                       3:43
 "driving time"                                                               3:57
 "arrow"                                                                      4:10

Limited Edition

 "NOW [Intro]"                                                                1:40
 "bit crash"                                                                  2:22
 "NO MUSIC, NO REASON"                                                        3:41
 "I think I can fly"                                                          3:39
 "BEAST"                                                                      3:14
 "nobody"                                                                     3:44
 "Suiren" (睡蓮)                                                3:52
 "DIRTY STORY"                                                                3:30
 "arrow"                                                                      4:10

Super Limited Edition

 "NOW [Intro]"                                                                1:40
 "bit crash"                                                                  2:22
 "NO MUSIC, NO REASON"                                                        3:41
 "ALIVE"                                                                      4:46
 "I think I can fly"                                                          3:39
 "BEAST"                                                                      3:14
 "nobody"                                                                     3:44
 "Suiren" (睡蓮)                                                3:52
 "DIRTY STORY"                                                                3:30
 "arrow"                                                                      4:10
 "GOKU"                                                                       3:32
 "GOKUSOU [NOW]"                                                              3:49

European Edition

 "NOW [intro]"                                                                1:40
 "bit crash"                                                                  2:22
 "NO MUSIC, NO REASON"                                                        3:41
 "ALIVE"                                                                      4:46
 "I think I can fly"                                                          3:39
 "BEAST"                                                                      3:14
 "nobody"                                                                     3:44
 "Suiren" (睡蓮)                                                3:52
 "DIRTY STORY"                                                                3:30
 "GAME"                                                                       3:43
 "driving time"                                                               3:57
 "arrow"                                                                      4:10
 "BORDER"                                                                     3:31
 "Crying Rain"                                                                4:57

References 

http://www.girugamesh.jp/english/discography.php

External links 
Girugamesh Discography (Maverick DC Group)

Girugamesh albums
2009 albums